Tricholoma moseri is a mushroom of the agaric genus Tricholoma. It was first formally described in 1989 by Rolf Singer.

It was named after Meinhard Michael Moser, an Austrian mycologist.

See also
List of North American Tricholoma
List of Tricholoma species

References

moseri
Fungi described in 1989
Fungi of North America